John Moore (born 1 January 1970) is an Irish film director and producer whose credits include the action war film Behind Enemy Lines and A Good Day to Die Hard.

Early life and education
Moore was born in Dundalk, Ireland, and attended Dublin Institute of Technology, where he attained a degree in Media Arts. Upon completing his course, Moore genuinely believed that he wouldn't go on to work within the medium of film, but after a few years, that promptly changed.

Career
After graduating, he wrote and directed a series of short films in Ireland. Several of these shorts have featured on Irish TV networks over the years, and along the way Moore founded an Irish-based production company called Clingfilms. He then went on to direct several commercials, including the launch advertisement for Dreamcast, which 20th Century Fox found so impressive they gave him the $17 million (BTL) budget for Behind Enemy Lines.

To date, Moore has made five films for 20th Century Fox: Behind Enemy Lines (2001),  Flight of the Phoenix (2004), The Omen (2006), Max Payne (2008) and A Good Day to Die Hard (2013). Despite receiving mixed reviews, both Behind Enemy Lines and The Omen did well at the box office. Flight of the Phoenix, received mainly negative reviews and grossed just under $35 million worldwide, much less than the film's budget. The behind the scenes documentary on the DVD shows him at multiple points berating crew on set. Max Payne also receiving mainly negative reviews, but became a box office success, grossing $85 million on a $35 million budget. A Good Day to Die Hard has also received mostly negative reviews, but grossed $304 million on a $92 million budget, making it his highest-grossing film.

In September 2008, Moore was involved in a dispute with the MPAA over the certification of his film Max Payne. The MPAA initially gave the film an R rating, which Moore argued against. The film was reedited and the rating was a month later changed to PG-13, just before theatrical distribution.

In late 2010, Moore was announced to be the director for the recent Die Hard film, A Good Day to Die Hard. The film premiered worldwide on 14 February 2013.

Moore was also considered to direct X-Men: The Last Stand as well as Friday the 13th.

In 2007 Moore obtained the rights to direct an adaptation of The Book of Lost Things through his Point Road production company. The rights have since lapsed.

Personal life

Moore's partner is Fiona Connon, a makeup artist whom he met through an industry friend early in his career in Ireland. They have one child, Buzz. The family reside in the US, and occasionally visit Ireland. In 2015 Moore expressed a desire to return home, but the nature of his work in Hollywood rendered it impractical.

Moore told the BBC in September 2004 that he firmly professes a belief in God. When asked if he was either religious or spiritual, Moore replied:

In 2013 Moore opened up about his struggles with alcohol. He has been sober since 2008, following what he describes as an intense period of drinking upon finishing promotional duties for Max Payne.

Critical evaluation
Despite his films receiving mixed reviews from critics, for the most part Moore's films have proved popular with audiences. Critic Armond White has described Moore as "a Peckinpah-esque, neo-Eisenstein stylist whose grade-B material (Behind Enemy Lines, Flight of the Phoenix, The Omen) has kept him from receiving the acclaim he deserves". In his review of Max Payne, White had stated that Moore "explores genuine, contemporary anxiety [and that] his images are richer than his plots".

Daniel M. Kimmel, writing for the New England Movies Weekly, found Moore's film A Good Day to Die Hard to be better than Live Free or Die Hard and states that the car chase scene "is well worth the price of admission". With a 3.5/5 rating, Kimmel summed up his review saying, "it's probably a good day to end the series at last, but it's an action-packed and entertaining finale." Rick Groen of The Globe and Mail criticized the action scenes as being "messy", but concluded his review saying that the film "continues the franchise without undue embarrassment."

Filmography
Short films

Feature films

References

External links

 

1970 births
Irish film directors
Irish film producers
Living people
People from Dundalk
Action film directors
Alumni of Dublin Institute of Technology
Irish expatriates in the United States